Hong Myong-hui  or Hong Myung-hee (born September 4, 1991,) is a North Korean footballer who played as a goalkeeper for the North Korea women's national football team. She was part of the team at the 2011 FIFA Women's World Cup. At the club level, she played for 25 April in North Korea.

References

External links
 

1991 births
Living people
North Korean women's footballers
North Korea women's international footballers
Place of birth missing (living people)
2011 FIFA Women's World Cup players
Women's association football goalkeepers
Asian Games gold medalists for North Korea
Asian Games silver medalists for North Korea
Asian Games medalists in football
Footballers at the 2010 Asian Games
Footballers at the 2014 Asian Games
Medalists at the 2010 Asian Games
Medalists at the 2014 Asian Games